Portrait of an Artist is the final studio album by pianist Joe Albany recorded in 1982 and released on the Elektra/Musician label.

Reception 

Allmusic's Scott Yanow said: "This mostly ballad-oriented trio set ... Albany, whose career (especially on records) did not really get going until his final decade, is in generally good form ... The album concludes with a brief interview that sums up some aspects of his episodic life".

Track listing 
 "Autumn in New York" (Vernon Duke) – 6:33
 "Guess I'll Hang My Tears Out to Dry" (Jule Styne, Sammy Cahn) – 4:46
 "For the Little Guy" (Joe Albany) – 6:42
 "They Say It's Wonderful" (Irving Berlin) – 5:07
 "Too Late Now" (Burton Lane, Alan Jay Lerner) – 5:30
 "Confirmation" (Charlie Parker) – 5:38
 "Ruby, My Dear" (Thelonious Monk) – 3:45
 A Conversation with Joe Albany – 4:50

Personnel 
Joe Albany – piano
Al Gafa – guitar
George Duvivier – bass
Charlie Persip – drums

References 

Joe Albany albums
1982 albums
Elektra/Musician albums
Albums produced by Mike Berniker